Chrystal Water and Power Company-Spencer Water and Ice Company, also known as Spencer Ice Plant, is a historic power station and ice manufacturing plant located at Spencer, Roane County, West Virginia. It was built in 1903 and expanded in 1911.  It is a one-story, brick industrial building in the Romanesque Revival style.  The original section measures 82 feet deep and 42 feet wide.  Also on the property is a maintenance shed dated to the 1930s.  Its development represented the first public attempt to bring water and power to the city of Spencer.

It was listed on the National Register of Historic Places in 2007.

References

Industrial buildings and structures on the National Register of Historic Places in West Virginia
Romanesque Revival architecture in West Virginia
Energy infrastructure completed in 1903
Buildings and structures in Roane County, West Virginia
National Register of Historic Places in Roane County, West Virginia
Ice companies